Tatopani Hydropower Station is a run-of-river hydroelectric plant located in Annapurna Rural Municipality, Myagdi-4, Tatopani, Myagdi District of Nepal. The flow from Tatopani River is used to generate 2.0 MW of electricity.  The plant is owned and developed by the government-owned Nepal Electricity Authority. The plant started generating electricity since 2051-12-06 BS. The generation license will expire in 2101-11-30 BS.

The power station is connected to the national grid by 33 kV transmission line.

It is the first hydropower project in Myagdi district.

Events
 In 2016, the power plant was damaged extensively by flooding.
 In April 2020, the inlet valve burst, causing flooding of the powerhouse.

See also

List of power stations in Nepal

References

Hydroelectric power stations in Nepal
Gravity dams
Run-of-the-river power stations
Dams in Nepal
Buildings and structures in Myagdi District